Old Chang Kee Ltd. is a Singaporean multinational snack, food and beverage chain. It specialises in curry puffs and other local snacks. Headquartered in Woodlands, Singapore, it is listed on the Singapore Exchange.

History
Old Chang Kee started off as a stall outside Rex Cinema at MacKenzie Road. It was bought over by Han Keen Juan in 1986. The preparation to go halal began in 2004. On completion of all their documentation process, the Halal certification application was submitted at the end of October 2004. Old Chang Kee product, outlets and 2 central kitchens were officially certified Halal by MUIS on 7 January 2005. Old Chang Kee is located at Woodlands Terrace as the only production ground.

Old Chang Kee was one of the six winners of the SPBA Distinctive Brand Awards 2005 and also one of the Singapore Brand Award Heritage Award Winner 2005. 

Old Chang Kee is known for its curry puffs and introduced other types of curry puffs and snacks. That same year, the products underwent rebranding, with its curry puffs renamed as Curry'O.

There are eighty outlets operating across Singapore with one in Australia, twenty in Indonesia, two in Malaysia and one in the United Kingdom.

The company was incorporated in Singapore on 16 December 2004 as a private limited company under the name Old Chang Kee Singapore Pte Ltd. On 22 November 2007, the Company changed its name to Old Chang Kee Ltd. in connection with its conversion into a public company limited. The company was listed on 16 January 2008 on Catalist-NS.

Products

Aside from the curry and sardine puffs, the company sells other types of snacks and finger food such as spring rolls, yam cakes, carrot cakes, as well as fishballs, gyoza, fried cuttlefish, breaded prawns, chicken nuggets and fried fish fillets.

References

External links
 

Companies listed on the Singapore Exchange
Fast-food chains of Singapore
Singaporean brands
1956 establishments in Singapore